, also known by her stage name  is a Japanese YouTuber who is a former member of the Japanese idol groups Yoshimotozaka46, NMB48 and AKB48. She is a former member of NMB48's Team N, and a former member of AKB48's Teams A and 4.

Biography 
Kotani passed NMB48's 1st generation auditions in September 2010. Her debut was on October 9, 2010. In March 2011, she was selected to Team N. She held a concurrent position with AKB48's Team A from August 2012 to April 2013, before holding another concurrent position in Team 4 from February 2014.

In the 2014 general elections, Kotani ranked for the first time, placing 61st with 12,913 votes.

Kotani's height on her official profile is 149 cm, but she is actually 147 cm. Her future dream is to be someone who appears frequently on variety shows, commercials and information programmes.

On March 26, 2015, it was announced that she would be released from her concurrent position in AKB48.

On August 20, 2018, she became a starting member of the Sakamichi Series idol group Yoshimotozaka46.

On March 23, 2020, Miaki announced her engagement to fellow Yoshimotozaka46 member  and departure from Yoshimoto Kogyo, her office at the time. She officially graduated from Yoshimotozaka46 on March 31, 2020.

On June 20, 2020, she opened her YouTube channel.

On November 1, 2020, she married SHUN SHUN CLINIC P, 7 months after the engagement announcement. On February 2, 2022, she announced her first pregnancy. On July 6, she gave birth to a baby girl.

Discography

Yoshimotozaka46 singles

NMB48 singles

AKB48 singles

Appearances

Movies
 NMB48 Geinin! The Movie Owarai Seishun Girls! (2013)
 NMB48 Geinin! The Movie Returns Sotsugyō! Owarai Seishun Girls!! Aratanaru Tabidachi (2014)

References

External links
Yoshimotozaka46 Official Profile  
NMB48 Official Profile 
 Official Blog 
 Riho Kotani on Google+ 
 Riho Kotani on Twitter 

1994 births
Living people
Japanese idols
Japanese women pop singers
Musicians from Kyoto Prefecture
NMB48 members
Yoshimotozaka46 members
Japanese YouTubers